Robert Cullen Henshaw (September 15, 1918 – May 29, 2011) was an American professional basketball player. He played for the Youngstown Bears in the National Basketball League for three total games during the 1945–46 season and averaged 1.0 point per game. He also played in various independent leagues of the era.

References

1918 births
2011 deaths
American men's basketball players
Basketball players from Ohio
Forwards (basketball)
Mount Union Purple Raiders men's basketball players
Sportspeople from Warren, Ohio
Youngstown Bears players